Jerome Smith (June 18, 1953 – July 28, 2000) was a guitarist at TK Records in Miami, Florida, who was a member of KC and the Sunshine Band from their inception in 1973 until his death in 2000.

His rhythm guitar playing was a key part of the band's propulsive disco sound, first gaining international attention on George McRae's hit recording of "Rock Your Baby" (for T.K.) in 1974.

Smith's high-pitched, restless guitar solo on "Get Down Tonight", KC and the Sunshine Band's first US #1 single, resembled the sound of a synthesizer. It was achieved by speeding up the solo guitar track against a normal-speed rhythm guitar track in the studio.

With the group he recorded five No. 1 songs, including "That's the Way (I Like It)", "(Shake, Shake, Shake) Shake Your Booty" and "I'm Your Boogie Man".

He was also sought after as a session guitarist, playing on 10 albums by the disco burlesque artist Blowfly 
In the 1990s, he contributed to the soundtrack of the television series Melrose Place.

He died on July 28, 2000, aged 47, when he was crushed by a bulldozer in Miami where he worked as a construction worker.

References

External links
Official Website (includes lyrics)
Band history

1953 births
2000 deaths
20th-century American musicians
Accidental deaths in Florida
African-American guitarists
American disco musicians
American funk guitarists
American soul guitarists
Epic Records artists
Grammy Award winners
Industrial accident deaths
KC and the Sunshine Band members
Musicians from Miami
Guitarists from Florida
American male guitarists
20th-century American guitarists
20th-century American male musicians